The 1977 Virginia Tech Gobblers football team was an American football team that represented Virginia Tech as an independent during the 1977 NCAA Division I football season. In their fourth year under head coach Jimmy Sharpe, the Gobblers compiled an overall record of 3–7–1.

Schedule

Roster
The following players were members of the 1977 football team.

References

Virginia Tech
Virginia Tech Hokies football seasons
Virginia Tech Gobblers football